"B.E.D." is a song by American singer Jacquees. It was first released on January 25, 2016 from his mixtape Mood, before being released as a single on July 8, 2016. It is the lead single from his debut studio album 4275 (2018). The song was a sleeper hit, and is considered Jacquees' breakout song.

Composition
The song samples the bridge of "Read Your Mind" by Avant in the chorus. It has been described as a "effectively erotic track" with a "sung/rapped hybrid".

Remix
The official remix of the song features American singer Ty Dolla Sign and American rapper Quavo. Also titled "B.E.D. (Part 2)", it was released on January 25, 2017. A music video for the remix was released on August 17, 2017.

Live performances
Jacquees performed the song at the 2018 Soul Train Music Awards.

Charts

Certifications

References

2016 singles
2016 songs
Jacquees songs
Cash Money Records singles